The College of Immigration and Citizenship Consultants (the College, CICC , CCIC) is the Canada-wide regulatory authority created to protect consumers by overseeing regulated immigration and citizenship consultants and international student advisors.

Pursuant to the College of Immigration and Citizenship Consultants Act (S.C. 2019, c. 29, s. 292) the College Act, the opening of the College was established by a Ministerial Order, which approved the previous regulator, the Immigration Consultants of Canada Regulatory Council ICCRC, to continue as the College. The College officially opened on November 23, 2021.

According to Canadian federal law, immigration consultants who provide their assistance for Canadian immigration or international student services for a fee need to be registered with the College and must be accredited as Regulated Canadian Immigration Consultants (RCICs) or Regulated International Student Immigration Advisors (RISIAs), respectively. (To act as an immigration consultant in Quebec, a person must be registered with the College, recognized by the Ministry of Immigration, Francisation and Integration, and registered on the Registre québécois des consultants en immigration.)

Its head office is located in Burlington, Ontario.

Mandate and legal framework 
Financially self-funded and self-sustaining, the College is a self-regulatory organization (SRO) that relies on licensee fees.

There are 2 types of immigration and citizenship representatives in Canada: paid (must be authorized) and unpaid. Only authorized representatives may charge a fee or receive any other type of payment for their services. Unpaid representatives can be family members, friends, or other third parties who do not charge a fee. In essence, unpaid representatives may give the same services as paid representatives, but they do it for free.

The federal mandate of the College of Immigration and Citizenship Consultants arises from the College of Immigration and Citizenship Consultants Act, the Immigration and Refugee Protection Act (IRPA) and the Citizenship Act, all of which require anyone in Canada who provides immigration and citizenship advice or representation for a fee "to be a member in good standing of the College, a Canadian law society, or the Chambre des notaires du Québec.

Individuals who provide immigration and citizenship services abroad are subject to Canadian law even when residing outside of Canada.

History 
In 2000, the Association of Immigration Counsel of Canada (AICC) and Organization of Professional Immigration Consultants (OPIC) partnered up to establish the Canadian Association of Professional Immigration Consultants (CAPIC), as a regulatory professional organization for immigration and citizenship consultation. The following year, the historic ruling for the case of Law Society of British Columbia v Mangat on 18 October 2001 became a catalyst for the self-regulation ambitions of Canada's immigration consultants.

In 2002, Minister of Citizenship and Immigration Denis Coderre established an advisory committee (including the AICC and OPIC) to help find problems in the immigration consulting industry and propose solutions. In May 2003, the committee presented its final report, recommending that the government create a self-regulatory body for immigration consultants. Later that year, the government would oblige the committee's recommendations, establishing the Canadian Society of Immigration Consultants (CSIC) as an "independent, federally incorporated not-for-profit body, responsible for regulating the activities of immigration consultant members, providing immigration advice for a fee."

The following year, OPIC and AICC joined together to form the Canadian Association of Professional Immigration Consultants (CAPIC), thereby succeeding CIPC and adopting its original name. In 2008, despite the existence of CSIC, the public and practitioners continued to have issues regarding the improper practices of some immigration consultants. In April, the Parliamentary Committee for Citizenship and Immigration re-examined the subject, travelling across Canada to hear testimony. The Committee concluded by recommending the establishment of "a stand-alone legislation to re-establish the Canadian Society of Immigration Consultants as a non-share capital corporation." In August 2010, Minister of Immigration and Citizenship Jason Kenney called for submissions from those interested in becoming the regulator for immigration consultants; he established a committee, with the help of CAPIC, for selecting the regulator based on requirements to address public concern.

The Immigration Consultants of Canada Regulatory Council (ICCRC) was chosen as the new regulator in 2011, with many of its founding directors being former CAPIC executives.
In June 2019, the College of Immigration and Citizenship Consultants Act was passed by Parliament providing the mandate for a new regulator for Regulated Canadian Immigration Consultants (RCIC) and Regulated International Student Immigration Advisors (RISIAs), called the College of Immigration and Citizenship Consultants (CICC). Coming into force on 26 November 2020, the Act includes, among other things, new powers to identify and pursue unlicensed immigration consultants. The Act was announced by the then Minister of Immigration, Refugees and Citizenship, Marco Mendicino.

The transition process for the College was temporarily delayed due to the COVID-19 pandemic.

The Minister of Immigration, Refugees and Citizenship approved ICCRC’s application for continuance and set the date of continuance as November 23, 2021. 

On November 23, 2021, the College of Immigration and Citizenship Consultants officially opened becoming the official regulator of immigration and citizenship consultants across Canada.

See also

 Immigration and Refugee Board of Canada
 Canadian Council of Better Business Bureaus
 Canadian Anti-Fraud Centre
 Office of Consumer Affairs

References

External links 

Immigration to Canada
Regulators of Canada